Torrey Davis (born September 24, 1988) is an American football defensive tackle who is currently a free agent. He has also played for the Calgary Stampeders, Hamilton Tiger-Cats and Edmonton Eskimos of the Canadian Football League (CFL).  He played college football of the Florida Gators football team for the University of Florida and the Jacksonville State Gamecocks football team of the Jacksonville State University.

A former five-star recruit out of Armwood High School, Davis played two seasons for the Gators, including the 2008 championship season. He made two goal-line tackles in the national championship game against Oklahoma. However, he also had off-the-field trouble, as he was cited for underage drinking in January 2008, and for driving with a suspended license in July 2008. In March 2009, he decided to leave the Florida Gators, and was soon later arrested for violation of probation. He transferred to Jacksonville State, where he played one season before leaving for the NFL.

Davis went undrafted in the 2010 NFL Draft, but was later signed on the Tampa Bay Buccaneers off-season squad. He did not make the season roster, and eventually played with Spokane and Kansas City of the Arena Football League, before winding up in the CFL. On June 9, 2016, Davis was assigned to the Tampa Bay Storm. On June 15, 2016, Davis was placed on recallable reassignment. On July 18, 2016, Davis was placed on league suspension.

References

External links
Hamilton Tiger-Cats bio
Florida Gators bio

1988 births
Living people
American football defensive tackles
Calgary Stampeders players
Edmonton Elks players
Florida Gators football players
Hamilton Tiger-Cats players
Jacksonville State Gamecocks football players
People from Seffner, Florida
Spokane Shock players
Kansas City Command players
Tampa Bay Storm players